Mawewe, or Maueva, was king of the Gaza Empire and son of king Soshangane Nxumalo. Mawewe was born to a Swati woman whom King Soshangane had married. Mawewe felt that since he was older than his half brother, Mzila of a Shangaan mother, that he should be king of Gaza. After the death of King Soshangane, Mawewe began to attack his brothers, including Mzila. Mzila fled and made his way to the Transvaal in 1859 to seek help to fight his brother.  Mawewe  was hostile to the Portuguese and wanted them out of Gaza territory. Mostly Vatsonga youths were used in his army, as his father King Soshangane did. Mawewe's reputation was that of expansionism. Most other clans and tribes were attacked or slaughtered, and people ran to Mzila. When Mzila returned, he had help from the Portuguese to fight Mawewe's army. Mzila managed to defeat his brother, despite Mawewe having a large and experienced army. Mawewe made his way to eSwatini (present day Swaziland) to seek for new beginnings. He used the surname Mkhatshwa, which most of his descendants still use today.

References

External links

Gaza Empire
African kings
19th-century monarchs in Africa
Mozambican royalty